Prioneris clemanthe, the redspot sawtooth, is a small butterfly of the family Pieridae, or the yellows and whites, and is found in Asia.

References
 

Prioneris
Butterflies of Asia
Taxa named by Henry Doubleday
Butterflies described in 1846